The following is a list of integrals of exponential functions. For a complete list of integral functions, please see the list of integrals.

Indefinite integral 

Indefinite integrals are antiderivative functions. A constant (the constant of integration) may be added to the right hand side of any of these formulas, but has been suppressed here in the interest of brevity.

Integrals of polynomials

Integrals involving only exponential functions

Integrals involving the error function

Other integrals

where 

 
 where 

the below formulae was proved by Toyesh Prakash Sharma.
(if  is a positive integer)
(if  is a positive integer)

Definite integrals 

 
The last expression is the logarithmic mean.

 (the Gaussian integral)

 (see Integral of a Gaussian function)

(the operator  is the Double factorial)

 
 ( is the modified Bessel function of the first kind)

where  is the Polylogarithm.

where  is the Euler–Mascheroni constant which equals the value of a number of definite integrals.

Finally, a well known result,

 (For integer m, n)

where  is the Kronecker delta.

See also
Gradshteyn and Ryzhik

References

Further reading

Toyesh Prakash Sharma, https://www.isroset.org/pdf_paper_view.php?paper_id=2214&7-ISROSET-IJSRMSS-05130.pdf

External links
 Wolfram Mathematica Online Integrator
 

Exponentials
Exponential functions